Ingo Züchner (born 11 September 1969) is a retired East German ski jumper.

References

External links

1969 births
Living people
German male ski jumpers
East German male skiers